St. Stephen's Episcopal Church, 1881 is a historical church building in Longmont, Colorado. Also known to be middle of Longmont, Colorado back when it started to develop.

The church is now home to the St. Vrain Historical Society.

It was built of red brick which was later painted white.

It was listed on the National Register of Historic Places in 1975, and was included as a contributing building in the 2017-designated Downtown Longmont Historic District.

See also
National Register of Historic Places listings in Boulder County, Colorado

References

External links
"Old" St. Stephen's - St. Vrain Historical Society

Downtown Longmont Historic District
Churches completed in 1881
19th-century Episcopal church buildings
Longmont, Colorado
Episcopal church buildings in Colorado
Churches on the National Register of Historic Places in Colorado
Churches in Boulder County, Colorado
National Register of Historic Places in Boulder County, Colorado
1881 establishments in Colorado